Tyloses are outgrowths/extragrouth on parenchyma cells of xylem vessels of secondary heartwood. When the plant is stressed by drought or infection, tyloses will fall from the sides of the cells and "dam" up the vascular tissue to prevent further damage to the plant.

Tyloses can aid in the process of making sapwood into heartwood in some hardwood trees, especially in trees with larger vessels. These blockages can be used in addition to gum plugs as soon as vessels become filled with air bubbles, and they help to form a stronger heartwood by slowing the progress of rot.

References

Plant anatomy